The Teloschistales are an order of mostly lichen-forming fungi belonging to the class Lecanoromycetes in the division Ascomycota. According to one 2008 estimate, the order contains 5 families, 66 genera, and 1954 species. The predominant photobiont partners for the Teloschistales are green algae from the genera Trebouxia and Asterochloris.

Families
Brigantiaeaceae
Letrouitiaceae
Megalosporaceae
Teloschistaceae

References

 
Lichen orders
Lecanoromycetes orders
Taxa described in 1986
Taxa named by David Leslie Hawksworth